Gull Island may refer to:

Australia
 Gull Island (Tasmania)

Canada
 Gull Island, Labrador
 Gull Island (Nunavut)
 Gull Island, Newfoundland 
 Gull Island (Lake Kagawong), Ontario
 Gull Island (Niagara River), Ontario
 Mohawk Island, Lake Erie, Ontario, formerly known as Gull Island
 Gull Island (Lake Ontario), off the Presqu'ile tombolo on the north shore of Lake Ontario

United Kingdom
 Gull Island (Hampshire)

United States
 Gull Island (Prudhoe Bay), Alaska
 Gull Island (Massachusetts), one of the Elizabeth Islands
Gull Island Bomb Area
 Gull Island (Michigan), the name of a number of islands 
 Gull Island (Wisconsin), one of the Apostle Islands of Lake Superior
 Gull Island Shoal (Lake Erie), Ohio
 Little Gull Island and Great Gull Island, New York
 The former name of Ellis Island, New York and New Jersey

See also
 
Gull Island vole
 Isle of May, Firth of Forth, Scotland, whose name may derive from "Gull Island"